Mondo Bizarro (a misspelled version of "Mondo Bizzarro," meaning "Weird World" in Italian) is the twelfth studio album by American punk rock band Ramones, released on September 1, 1992, by Radioactive Records. It is the first studio album to feature their new bassist, C.J. Ramone, who replaced original member Dee Dee Ramone. The album was re-released in the UK by the Captain Oi! record label on August 10, 2004, with the band's cover of the Spider-Man theme song included as a bonus track.

Background
Mondo Bizarro was the Ramones' first studio album in three years, after the band left Sire Records for a new contract with Radioactive Records. The title was taken from the film of the same name, a 1966 sequel to the film Mondo Cane.

In his 1998 autobiography, Dee Dee Ramone noted that, while he had left the band, he sold them the publishing for three new compositions—"Poison Heart," "Main Man" and "Strength to Endure"—to pay for a lawyer to help get him out of jail, following an arrest for possession of marijuana. He added, "I don't know why no one in New York, or none of the Ramones, couldn't have loaned me a few thousand dollars, instead of forcing me to go through all the paranoia, confusion and extra pain of a maneuver like that. [...] It seemed that the Ramones couldn't live without me, but at the same time they treated me like an enemy." "Poison Heart" and "Strength to Endure" were released as the album's singles, in June and October 1992, respectively.

In a 1992 interview for an Argentinian newspaper, Johnny Ramone said of the album, "Generally I always find two or three songs that I hate. From Mondo Bizarro, I really like almost all the songs and I am very satisfied with the result." However, when he was interviewed about the album for the 2003 documentary End of the Century, he stated, "I don't like it. I don't like it at all." In Johnny's 2012 autobiography, Commando, he awarded the album (along with its predecessor, 1989's Brain Drain) a "C" grade, stating, "we needed more Dee Dee songs on it. [...] The songs are the weak spots on the album. [...] C.J. was in the band, but his writing wasn't up to par yet."

Songs
The song "Censorshit" was written by Joey Ramone about how rock and rap albums were being censored by the Parents Music Resource Center, a group of politicians' wives who sought to put parental advisory warning labels on records, a practice which has since become standard. It has a reference to Ozzy Osbourne and Frank Zappa in the line, "Ask Ozzy, Zappa, or me, we'll show you what it's like to be free." The song is addressed to Tipper Gore, who was the wife of then-Tennessee Senator and eventual Vice President of the United States, Al Gore. In his book Commando, Johnny Ramone stated that he "didn't like the lyrics on 'Censorshit.' It was stupid. I liked the song, though. Joey wrote this song about Vice President Al Gore's wife, Tipper Gore, then he went on and voted for Bill Clinton."

"Heidi Is a Headcase" was written by Joey Ramone and Daniel Rey. According to an interview on the podcast Ramones of the Day, C.J. Ramone stated that the song was about a girl named Heidi, whom both Joey and C.J. had dated for a period of time.

"Take It as It Comes" is a cover song, originally recorded by the Doors for their 1967 debut album. The 2004 CD reissue bonus track, "Spiderman," is a cover of the theme song from the original Spider-Man animated series. It was originally released as an unlisted bonus track on initial releases of the Ramones' 1995 album ¡Adios Amigos! (omitted on later editions), and a slightly different version was available on the 1995 various artists compilation album Saturday Morning: Cartoons' Greatest Hits.

Reception
Although Mondo Bizarro was considered to be a "comeback" for the Ramones—following both lineup and label changes, and the dwindling sales of their previous albums from the mid-to-late 1980s (up to and including Brain Drain, which was originally meant to be the band's "comeback")—the album peaked at number 190 on the Billboard 200 chart, the lowest chart position in their career. However, the album's lead single, "Poison Heart", did become one of the Ramones' top ten hits in their native America, peaking at number six on the Billboard Modern Rock Tracks chart. The album was certified gold in Brazil in 2001.

Track listing

Personnel

Ramones
 Joey Ramone – lead vocals (tracks 1–4, 6, 7, 9–14)
 Johnny Ramone – guitar
 Marky Ramone – drums
 C.J. Ramone – bass, lead vocals (tracks 5, 8)

Additional musicians
 Vernon Reid – guitar solo (track 11)
 Joe McGinty – keyboards (track 7)
 Flo & Eddie – backing vocals (tracks 3, 13)
 Daniel Rey – additional guitar (uncredited)
 Andy Shernoff – additional guitar (uncredited)
 Ed Stasium – additional guitar (uncredited)

Technical
 Ed Stasium – producer, mixing
 Paul Hamingson – engineer, mixing assistant
 Joe Warda – assistant engineer (The Magic Shop)
 Bryce Goggin – assistant engineer (Baby Monster)
 Garris Shipon – assistant engineer (Baby Monster)
 Eugene 'UE' Nastasi – assistant mixing engineer (East Hill)
 Greg Calbi – mastering
 George DuBose – art direction, photography, design
 Gary Kurfirst – executive producer

Charts

Album

Singles

Certifications

References 

Ramones albums
1992 albums
Albums produced by Ed Stasium
Chrysalis Records albums
Radioactive Records albums